Petřvald is a municipality and village in Nový Jičín District in the Moravian-Silesian Region of the Czech Republic. It has about 1,800 inhabitants.

Administrative parts
The village of Petřvaldík is an administrative part od Petřvald.

History
The first written mention of Petřvald is from 1267.

References

Villages in Nový Jičín District